Östra Ljungby is a locality situated in Klippan Municipality, Skåne County, Sweden with 935 inhabitants in 2010.

References 

Populated places in Klippan Municipality
Populated places in Skåne County